Arachnis tristis is a moth of the family Erebidae. It was described by Walter Rothschild in 1935. It is found in Mexico.

References

Spilosomina
Moths of Central America
Taxa named by Walter Rothschild
Moths described in 1935